Edward Joseph Winceniak (born April 16, 1929) is a retired American professional baseball player and scout. He was born in Chicago, Illinois. An infielder, he appeared in 32 games played over parts of two seasons (1956–57) in Major League Baseball for the Chicago Cubs.

His professional career began in 1948 and ended in 1959 in the minor leagues, with three seasons (1951–53) out of action. During his two trials with the Cubs he was used largely as a pinch hitter or pinch runner, appearing in the field in 12 of his 32 MLB games played. Altogether, Winceniak registered 71 plate appearances, with six runs scored and 14 career hits. His lone home run was hit off Hal Jeffcoat of the Cincinnati Redlegs on May 12, 1957. The solo shot came at Wrigley Field during the first game of a doubleheader. Winceniak also started the nightcap and collected a single off Don Gross. Those were his last two games in the majors as he was sent to the Open-Classification Portland Beavers of the Pacific Coast League at the May cutdown.

References

External links

1929 births
Living people
Atlanta Braves scouts
Baseball players from Chicago
Chicago Cubs players
Denver Bears players
Des Moines Bruins players
Havana Sugar Kings players
Hutchinson Cubs players
Los Angeles Angels (minor league) players
Major League Baseball infielders
Montreal Expos scouts
Portland Beavers players
Rock Hill Chiefs players
St. Paul Saints (AA) players
Seattle Rainiers players
Visalia Cubs players
American expatriate baseball players in Cuba